Teet is an Estonian masculine given name. People with the name Teet include:
Teet Allas (born 1977), Estonian footballer
Teet Helm (born 1959), Estonian politician
Teet Jagomägi (born 1969), Estonian politician
Teet Järvi (born 1958), Estonian cellist
Teet Kallas (born 1943), Estonian writer
Teet Kask (born 1968), Estonian choreographer

References

Estonian masculine given names